No Cloak – No Dagger is a British television series which originally aired on the BBC in 1963. All six episodes are believed to be lost.

Main cast
 William Franklyn as Ian Lambart
 Lana Morris as Emma Cresswell
 Cyril Luckham as  Det. Chief-Supt. Gage
 Caroline Blakiston as  Pat Penmore
 Manning Wilson as Sergeant Rose
 Patrick Troughton as Trev
 Peter Thomas as Hawkins
 Freda Bamford as Kitty
 Armine Sandford as Mary
 Jack Stewart as Donald Fraser
 Rio Fanning as Vallins
 Wendy Gifford as Alice
 Clifford Cocks as Policeman  
 Denis Cleary as Plain clothes man
 Norman Mitchell as Police Sergeant

References

Bibliography
 Maxford, Howard. Hammer Complete: The Films, the Personnel, the Company. McFarland, 2018.

External links
 

BBC television dramas
1963 British television series debuts
1963 British television series endings
English-language television shows